David Thomas Abercrombie (June 6, 1867 – August 29, 1931) was the founder of the American lifestyle brand Abercrombie & Fitch. A topographer and expert in the outdoors, Abercrombie opened the company as New York's outfitter for the elite and later partnered up with co-founder Ezra Fitch – both men managed the Company through great years of success.

Today, his company, Abercrombie & Fitch Co. remains as a prominent American clothing brand. A brand in his name was released by the company in 1998 – abercrombie.

Life and career

Birth, studies, and family
David T. Abercrombie was born in Baltimore, Maryland on June 6, 1867 as the son of John and Elizabeth Sarah Abercrombie (née Daniel). He was of Scottish descent as his father John was born in Scotland and his maternal grandfather was also from Scotland. His children: Elizabeth, born 1897; Lucy, born 1899; David,  born 1901 ; Abbott, born 1909. He was educated in the public schools of Baltimore and by private instructors. Abercrombie later came to study at Baltimore City College and became a practicing civil engineer and topographer, including explorer and chief of survey for Norfolk & Western Railroad in the coal and timber lands of West Virginia.

Abercrombie & Fitch Co.

On June 4, 1892, he founded Abercrombie Co. as a small waterfront shop at No.36 South Street in downtown Manhattan, New York; where wealthy New York businessperson Ezra Fitch was one of his regular customers. On April 25, 1896, Abercrombie married Lucy Abbot Cate in Baltimore. The couple gave birth to four children: Elizabeth, Lucy, David, and Abbott. The Abercrombie family resided in Newark, New Jersey for some years and maintained a log cabin getaway on Pine Island on Greenwood Lake, New Jersey. Later they resided in Brooklyn, New York and finally in Ossining, New York.

In 1900, Fitch bought a share into the successfully growing Abercrombie Company. In 1904, it was incorporated and renamed "Abercrombie & Fitch Co." Abercrombie later entered into disputes with Ezra Fitch over Fitch's visions of expanding the company to appeal to the general public, as Abercrombie sought to maintain the company's standing as an elite store for the elite outdoorsman. Possibly as a result of this rift, Abercrombie left the Company in 1907, selling his share of it to Fitch.

Post A&F and death
In 1917, Abercrombie joined Baker, Murray & Imbrie ("The Sporting Goods Store of Expert Personal Service") as vice president. He later founded the "David T. Abercrombie Company", a New York City sportsmen's outfitter, and "Abercrombie Corporation", which packed commodities for export. In 1927 he finished work on a large granite castle in Ossining overlooking the Hudson River with a 300-acre estate, which he named Elda after the initials of his children's names. It has since fallen into disrepair. There he died, intestate, in 1931.

Legacy
David Abercrombie's influence in his company has remained as a greater part of it, even after Abercrombie's departure and the company's 1960s-1970s financial issues. Repositioned in the 1980s as a lifestyle brand for the collegiate, Abercrombie & Fitch remains today as a cultural American brand. Although altered to accommodate its promoted image of "Casual Luxury", Abercrombie & Fitch continues to reference to its original image of its early years with the Abercrombie moose and "sexy" male ruggedness. Abercrombie's name is often used as an abbreviated form of the company's name and is used frequently more than Ezra Fitch's "Fitch" (e.g. "Abercrombie Christmas 2007", "abercrombie.com", "the Abercrombie lifestyle...", etc.). When the Company released a children's version of the A&F brand, abercrombie, it chose to name it after Abercrombie.

Unlike Ezra Fitch, Abercrombie's name has never been used for clothing lines and other products for the A&F brand (Fitch's lines have been removed).

See also
Ezra Fitch

References
Bibliography
 
 "D.T. Abercrombie, Sportsman, is Dead; Originator of Noted Firm Dealing in Sporting Goods--Was Explorer, Hunter, Fisherman." The New York Times (August 30, 1931), p. N6
 "Abercrombie Left Estate of $10,793; Founder of Sporting Goods Firm Bequeathed Property to Widow and Three Children", The New York Times (March 12, 1932) p. 6

Notes

External links
  Photo of David Abercrombie's Ossining castle

1867 births
1931 deaths
Abercrombie & Fitch
American people of Scottish descent
Retail company founders
Baltimore City College alumni
Businesspeople from Baltimore
People from Ossining, New York